Winifred Beach is a locally popular public beach in Portland, Jamaica.

A campaign is in progress to keep the beach public in the face of corporate efforts to privatize, develop, and enclose the surrounding area to all but paid access.

See also
 List of beaches in Jamaica

References

External links
Virtual Travel Globe - 360 degree panorama of the beach
Photos:     

Beaches of Jamaica
Geography of Portland Parish
Tourist attractions in Portland Parish